Countess of Pembroke is a title that has been borne by several women throughout history, including:

 Isabel de Clare, 4th Countess of Pembroke (1172–1220), wife of William Marshal, 1st Earl of Pembroke, and Countess of Pembroke in her own right
 Mary de St Pol, (c.1303–1377), wife of Aymer de Valence, 2nd Earl of Pembroke (c.1275–1324)
 Margaret of England (1346–1361), wife of John Hastings, 2nd Earl of Pembroke; daughter of King Edward III and Philippa of Hainault.
 Anne Manny (1355–1384), 2nd wife to John Hastings, 2nd Earl of Pembroke; daughter of Walter Manny, Baron Manny and Margaret, Duchess of Norfolk.
 Anne Devereux (c.1430–c.1486), wife of William Herbert, 1st Earl of Pembroke.
 Mary Woodville (c.1456–1481), wife of William Herbert, 2nd Earl of Pembroke. Title attained in 1479.
 Catherine Woodville (1458–1497), wife of Jasper Tudor, 1st Earl of Pembroke.
 Anne Parr (1515–1552), wife of William Herbert, 1st Earl of Pembroke and sister of Queen consort Catherine Parr.
 Mary Sidney (1561–1621), wife of Henry Herbert, 2nd Earl of Pembroke; one of the first English women to achieve a major reputation for her literary works, translations and literary patronage.
 Mary Talbot (circa 1594–1649), wife of William Herbert, 3rd Earl of Pembroke.
 Elizabeth Spencer (1737–1831), wife of Henry Herbert, 10th Earl of Pembroke daughter of Charles Spencer, 3rd Duke of Marlborough and Elizabeth Trevor.